Golden Rock Airport may refer to

F.D. Roosevelt Airport,  Sint Eustatius
Robert L. Bradshaw International Airport, Saint Kitts and Nevis